Phalloplasty is the construction or reconstruction of a penis or the artificial modification of the penis by surgery. The term is also occasionally used to refer to penis enlargement.

History
Russian surgeon Nikolaj Bogoraz performed the first reconstruction of a total penis using rib cartilage in a reconstructed phallus made from a tubed abdominal flap in 1936.
The first female to male sex reassignment surgery was performed in 1946 by Sir Harold Gillies on fellow physician Michael Dillon, a trans man, documented in Pagan Kennedy's book The First Man-Made Man. Gillies' technique remained the standard one for decades. Later improvements in microsurgery made more techniques available.

Indications
A complete construction or reconstruction of a penis can be performed on patients who:
 Have congenital anomalies such as micropenis, epispadias, and hypospadias
 Have lost their penis
 Desire sex reassignment surgery as part of their gender transition.

Techniques and related procedures

There are different techniques for phalloplasty. Construction of a new penis (sometimes called a neophallus) typically involves taking a tissue flap from a donor site (such as the forearm). Extending the urethra through the length of the neophallus is another goal of phalloplasty.

Temporary lengthening can also be gained by a procedure that releases the suspensory ligament where it is attached to the pubic bone, thereby allowing the penis to be advanced toward the outside of the body. The procedure is performed through a discreet horizontal incision located in the pubic region where the pubic hair will help conceal the incision site. However, scar formation can cause the penis to retract. Therefore, the American Urological Association "considers the division of the suspensory ligament of the penis for increasing penile length in adults to be a procedure which has not been shown to be safe or efficacious."

Penile implants 

Phalloplasty requires an implanted penile prosthesis to achieve an erection. Penile prostheses are implanted devices intended to restore the erectile rigidity in cisgender men and to build a neophallus (new penis) in transgender men. Penile implants have been used in phalloplasty surgeries both in cisgender and transgender patients since 1970s.

There are two main types of penile implants – malleable and inflatable implants. Both types have a pair of cylinders implanted into the penis, replacing the non-erectile tissue in cisgender men and serving as the core for the neophallus in the phalloplasty procedure. The cylinder of the inflatable implant is filled with sterile saline solution. Pumping saline into the chambers of this cylinder produces an erection. The glans of the penis, however, remains unaffected. In sex reassignment surgeries, a new penis is formed with the use of penile implant surrounded with a tissue flap. The pump unit of inflatable penile implants resembles a human testicle and can serve as an artificial testicle for concomitant scrotoplasty. Initially, standard penile implants were used in phalloplasty procedures. However, since there is no corpus cavernosum in the penis undergoing phalloplasty, and the fact that standard penile implants were designed to be implanted in corpus cavernosum, there were many adverse outcomes. Since 2015, Zephyr Surgical Implants proposes malleable and inflatable penile implants particularly designed for phalloplasty surgeries. Implantation procedures are usually done in a separate surgery to allow time for proper healing.

Explanation of techniques

Flap from the arm
 Sensation is retained through the clitoral tissue at the base of the neophallus. Nerves from the flap and the tissue it has been attached to may eventually connect.

Flap from the side of the chest
The disadvantages include:
 Uses a motor nerve so erogenous sensation cannot be achieved, only tactile sensation.
 It can pull the nipple to the side causing it to be off the usual location.

Flap from the leg

Pubic area flap

Latissimus dorsi phalloplasty 
This phalloplasty method is from latissimus dorsi musculocutaneous flap.

Gillies technique

Abdominal muscle

Subcutaneous soft silicone implant
This phalloplasty procedure involves the insertion of a subcutaneous soft silicone implant under the penile skin.

No-touch surgical technique
The no-touch surgical technique for penile prosthesis implantation is a surgical procedure developed by J. Francois Eid for the implantation of a penile implant. Implantation through the use of the "No-Touch" technique minimizes the risk of infection.

As advancements in the design and manufacturing process of the IPP improved its mechanical survival  infection has emerged as the leading cause of implant failure. Although relatively infrequent (varying from .06% to 8.9%) infection of a penile prosthesis results in serious medical consequences for the bearer,  requiring complete removal of the device and permanent loss of penile size and anatomy. Bacterial contamination of the device occurs during the surgery, and is caused by allowing direct or indirect contact of the prosthesis with the patient's skin. Over 70% of infections form from skin organisms including Staphylococcus epidermis, Staphylococcus aureus, Streptococcus and Candida albicans.

Traditional strategies to combat infections aim at decreasing skin colony count such as scrubbing skin preparation with alcohol and chlorhexidine or kill bacteria once the implant is contaminated by skin flora such as intravenous antibiotics, antibiotic irrigation and antibiotic-coated implants. The "No-Touch" technique is unique in that it aims at preventing bacterial contamination of the prosthesis by completely eliminating contact of the  device with the skin.

Paired with the antibiotic-coated implant, the "No Touch" technique decreases infection to a rate of 0.46%, opposing the traditional method which has an infection rate of 5%. The use of an antibiotic-coated implant and a no-touch surgical technique with skin preparation measures and peri-operative antibiotic use has been found to be of high importance in the prevention of infection among penile implants. Eid developed the technique in 2006 on the hypothesis that eliminating any contact between the prosthesis and the skin, either directly or indirectly via surgical instruments or gloves, should reduce the incidence of contamination of the device with skin flora responsible for infection.

Procedure

Three days prior to the procedure, a patient is placed on oral fluoroquinolone, an antibacterial drug. During this time, the patient scrubs their lower abdomen and genitals daily with chlorhexidine soap. On the day of the surgery, vancomycin and gentamicin are administered intravenously one to two hours prior to the procedure. The lower abdomen and genitals are shaved, scrubbed for five minutes with a chlorhexidine sponge and prepped with chorhexidine/alcohol applicator. The area is then draped with a surgical drape and a Vi Drape over the genitalia. Before the incision is made, a Foley catheter is inserted in the bladder through the urethra.

A  scrotal incision is made on the penoscrotal raphe and carried down through the subcutaneous tissue to the Buck's fascia. A Scott retractor, a flexible device that holds open the skin of the surgical site, is applied to the area.

Up until this stage of the surgery, the process has been consistent with the sanitary practices associated with standard surgical sterility. At this stage of the "No-Touch" technique, after the incision has been made, all instruments, including surgical gloves that have touched skin are discarded. A loose drape is then deployed over the entire surgical field and secured at the periphery with adhesive strips. A small opening in the drape is then made overlying the incision and yellow hooks utilized to secure the edges of the opening to the edges of the incision, completely covering and isolating the patient's skin. At this point, new instruments and equipment are replaced and the entire prosthesis is inserted through the small opening of the loose drape. The loose drape allows for manipulation of the penis and scrotum required for this procedure without touching the skin.

Implantation of the device continues with an incision and dilation of corpora, sizing and placing the penile cylinders, and placement of the pump in the scrotum and the reservoir in the retropubic space. Saline is used throughout the implantation for irrigation. Once the corporotomies are closed and all of the tubing and components of the prosthesis covered with a layer of Buck's fascia, subcutaneous tissues are closed and the "No-Touch" drape is removed and the skin closed.

Future
In the future, bioengineering may be used to create fully functional penises. Penis transplantation could be a standardized method in the future.

See also

List of transgender-related topics
Metoidioplasty
Penis enlargement
Penis transplantation
Sex reassignment surgery

References

Sources

 Total Phalloplasty Using a Musculocutaneous Latissimus Dorsi Flap by Sava V. Perovic, Rados Djinovic (British Journal of Urology, Reconstructive Urology, Volume 100 Issue 4, Sep 2007)
 New Technique of Total Phalloplasty With Reinnervated Latissimus Dorsi Myocutaneous Free Flap in Female-to-Male Transsexuals by Vesely, Jiri; Hyza, Petr; Ranno, Raul; Cigna, Emanuele; Monni, Nicola; al etc. (Annals of Plastic Surgery, Volume 58 Issue 5, May 2007)
 Simultaneous Penis and Perineum Reconstruction Using a Combined Latissimus Dorsi-Scapular Free Flap with Intraoperative Penile Skin Expansion by Rohrich, Rod J.; Allen, Terry; Lester, Fred; Young, Jonathan P.; Katz, Scott L. (Journal of Plastic and Reconstructive Surgery, Volume 99 Issue 4, April 1997)
 Neophalloplasty in Female-to-Male Transsexuals with the Island Tensor Fasciae Latae Flap by Santanelli, Fabio M.D., Ph.D.; Scuderi, Nicolò (Journal of Plastic and Reconstructive Surgery, Volume 105 Issue 6, May 2000)
 A New Surgical Procedure for Phallic Reconstruction: Istanbul Flap by Mutaf, Mehmet (Journal of Plastic and Reconstructive Surgery, Volume 105 Issue 4, April 2000)
 One-Stage Reconstruction of the Penis with Composite Iliac Crest and Lateral Groin Skin Flap by Sun, Guang-ci M.D.; Huang, Jin-jing (Annals of Plastic Surgery, Volume 15 Issue 6, December 1985)
 A Novel Single-Flap Technique for Total Penile Reconstruction: The Pedicled Anterolateral Thigh Flap by Lee, Gordon K.; Lim, Angeline F.; Bird, Erin (Journal of Plastic and Reconstructive Surgery, Volume 124 Issue 1, July 2009)
 Penile Reconstruction by the Free Scapular Flap and Malleable Penis Prosthesis by Yang, Mingyong; Zhao, Muxin; Li, Senkai; Li, Yangqun (Journal of Plastic and Reconstructive Surgery, Volume 59 Issue 1, July 2007)
 
 Long-Term Follow-Up of Total Penile Reconstruction with Sensate Osteocutaneous Free Fibula Flap in 18 Biological Male Patients by Sengezer, Mustafa; Öztürk, Serdar; Deveci, Mustafa; Odabasi, Zeki (Journal of Plastic and Reconstructive Surgery, Volume 114 Issue 2, August 2004)
 Long-Term Fate of the Bony Component in Neophallus Construction with Free Osteofasciocutaneous Forearm or Fibula Flap in 18 Female-to-Male Transsexuals by Papadopulos, Nikolaos A.; Schaff, Juergen; Biemer, Edgar (Journal of Plastic and Reconstructive Surgery, Volume 109 Issue 3, March 2002)
 Use of forearm free-flap phalloplasty in bladder exstrophy adults by Marc-Olivier  Timsit, Pierre Mouriquand, Alain  Ruffion, Alain  Bouillot, Diala  Dembelé, Arnaud  Mejean, Fanny  Lalloue, Albert  Leriche and Nicolas Morel-Journel (BJU International, Volume 103 Issue 10, Dec 2008)
 Phalloplasty for female transsexuals with sensate free forearm flap by Rong-Hwang Fang, Jin-Teh Lin, Shiuh Ma (Microsurgery, Volume 15 Issue 5, Oct 2005)
 Long-term outcome of forearm flee-flap phalloplasty in the treatment of transsexualism by Albert  Leriche, Marc-Olivier Timsit, Nicolas Morel-Journel, André Bouillot, Diala Dembele and Alain  Ruffion (BJU International, Volume 101 Issue 10, Jan 2008)
 Penile Reconstruction: Is the Radial Forearm Flap Really the Standard Technique? by Monstrey, Stan; Hoebeke, Piet; Selvaggi, Gennaro; al etc. (Journal of Plastic and Reconstructive Surgery, Volume 124 Issue 2, August 2009)
 Addressing the ideal requirements by free flap phalloplasty: Some reflections on refinements of technique by J. Joris Hage, Floris H. De Graaf (Microsurgery, Volume 14 Issue 9, Oct 2005)
 Total Phallic Construction in Female to Male Transsexuals by Giulio Garaffa, Nim A. Christopher, David J. Ralph (Current Urology, Vol. 3, No. 3, 2009)
 Gender Reassigment by Dan Greenwald and Wayne Stadelmann (eMedicine Journal, Volume 2 Number 7, 6 July 2001)
 Gender Identity Disorders: Diagnostic and Surgical Aspects by Michael Sohn, and Hartmut Bosinski, MD (Journal of Sexual Medicine, Volume 4 Issue 5, Aug 2007)
 Glans sculpting in phalloplasty — experiences in female-to-male transsexuals by Rong-Hwang Fang, Yi-Sheng Kaoa, Shiuh Ma, Jin-Teh Lin (Journal of Plastic, Reconstructive & Aesthetic Surgery, Volume 51, Issue 5, July 1998)
 Severe Penile Injuries: Etiology, Management and Outcomes by Sava V. Perovic, Urologia Polska (Polish Journal of Urology) 2005/58/3, ISSN 0500-7208.

External links
 FemaletoMale.org | Information about Phalloplasty
 Video: Minimally Invasive Penile Implant Surgery to correct erectile disfunction
 No-touch technique

Male genital surgery
Gender-affirming surgery (female-to-male)
Genital modification and mutilation
Human penis
Plastic surgery